Theresa Hightower (  October 10, 2018) was an American jazz singer. Born in Atlanta Georgia, she began her singing career at 19. Hightower played concert halls in the United States, Europe and the Middle East. She also played musical theatre and cabaret, and she appeared in movies. She died of colon cancer.

References

1950s births
2018 deaths
People from Atlanta
American women jazz singers
20th-century African-American women singers
American jazz singers
Musicians from Atlanta
Deaths from colorectal cancer
Deaths from cancer in Georgia (U.S. state)
21st-century African-American people
21st-century African-American women